Perdiki (Greek: Περδίκη) is a small village in the northeastern corner of the Greek island of Icaria. Perched up in the mountains, it houses close to 400 residents in small houses tucked into the forests, and it is the birthplace of names like Kassotis, Frangos, Safos, and Tripodis. Perdiki is one of the larger villages on Icaria, although its population is spread throughout a plateau.

On the western side of the village, the church of Agia Matrona (meaning: Saint Matrona) stands watch over the village's cemetery, which has been used for hundreds of years.

References 

Villages in Greece